Goldfine is a surname. Notable people with the surname include:

Andy Goldfine (born 1954), American businessman
Dean Goldfine (born 1965), American tennis player and coach